The 90's was an American independent documentary series created by Tom Weinberg and Joel Cohen that ran for four years on Public Broadcasting Service (PBS). It premiered on June 25, 1989. The show generated an audience of 25 million and PBS aired it on 160 stations at its national, prime-time peak. Throughout its run, it received praise from outlets across the nation and Billboard described it as "All the things Television was born to do but never does." The show included politics, talk segments, and interviews. Each hour-long episode featured the work of dozens of different independent video producers who mailed tapes for submission, as well as the work of about a dozen "camcorder correspondents" working under contract for the show. It came to an end in 1992.

Background 
The 90's can be seen as a continuation of the 1978 series Image Union, also produced by Tom Weinberg and aired on WTTW. With new technology opening up video for the masses, Weinberg and the broadcasting channel felt it was necessary to broadcast independent producers and their unfiltered views, or "real perspectives on real life." Similar to Image Union, The 90's was made up of these compiled clips and submissions, and had no host or narrators, only transitioning between clips with title cards or the occasional voice over by Weinberg. The largest difference between the shows was that Image Union was local, while The 90's had a more national focus and broadcast. In addition, it had video correspondents (6 or 7) in charge of creating and soliciting video content.

Although the earlier episodes were made of videos from people Weinberg and Cohen knew, as the series aired, they received more national and global submissions. To foster this environment, Weinberg and Cohen emphasized for their producers to not get in the way of the content, in order to truly let audiences make their own judgements. For contributors, the incentive besides exposure was a payment of $125 per minute aired.

The series was funded by the John D. and Catherine T. MacArthur Foundation, Corporation for Public Broadcasting, PBS Program Fund, Rockefeller Foundation and Instructional Telecommunications Fund (which later became "Free Speech TV" and Voqal TV).

Edited episode 

In 1992, there was controversy when an episode of The 90's was edited for content by WTTW. KBDI had access to both unedited and edited version, and opted to broadcast the original. KDBI general manager Ted Krichels said of the show: "It is outrageous and off-the-wall some of the time, and if anybody expects it to be some sort of safe show they've got the wrong program. I think what's happening generally is a lot of people are just politically paranoid, and PBS gets funding from government agencies, and it's all political." Chicago Reader wrote that if Tom Weinberg had refused these changes, "WTTW would have disowned the show and very few PBS stations would ever have carried it."

Specifically, Chicago video producer Bob Hercules had directed Stoney Burke, a San Francisco-based political satirist, to do street interviews at the 1992 Republican Convention. While some of Burke's interviews made the final cut, WTTW had removed his interactions with figures like housing secretary Jack Kemp, Senator Alfonse D'Amato, and Oliver North. This was publicized by text in Chicago Reader instead, which showed how Burke was pushing Kemp on vacant public housing and homelessness in Detroit, inflaming D'Amato about his "high-priced" politician status, and challenging North about his role in the CIA's involvement in Nicaragua.

In the Chicago Reader, Bob Hercules was quoted as stating that he considered the matter censorship by WTTW. Hercules suggested that it occurred because of backlash to Channel 11 by the religious right and figures including Jesse Helms and Bob Dole.

WTTW's Bruce Marcus, senior vice president for marketing and communications, justified the changes on the principle of "balance", stating that Hercules' coverage was biased in comparison to what was done by the show for the 1992 Democratic Convention. In comparison, fellow The 90's video producer Scott Jacobs opted for a fly-on-the-wall method to document the activities of John Hart, a leader of the Bill Clinton campaign.

Reception 

The first season of The 90's aired in 1989 on two PBS affiliates, KBDI-TV in Denver, Colorado and WTTW in Chicago, Illinois. A year after its first broadcast, in July 1990, The 90's had won a $350,000 grant, designated for prime-time broadcasting. In 1990, the show had already entered its second season and was now being broadcast at 90 stations, "including nine of the top ten markets among PBS affiliates."

In 1991, The 90's joined PBS's national prime-time lineup and it aired its third season every Tuesday on its peak of 160 stations. In September 1991, it also became available on video/VHS tape. The third and fourth season were funded by the $350,000 grant.

For the nine-episode fourth season in 1992, Tom Weinberg had hopes of expanding it into "as many as 11 episodes with a cost of $1.1 million", Current Public Telecommunications Review wrote. The 90's was widely praised at this point. It was reviewed positively by publications like the Los Angeles Times, Daily Herald, Billboard, Camcorder Magazine, Chicago Tribune, The Arizona Republic, The Washington Post, NPR, The Village Voice, North Carolina Airwaves, Minneapolis Star Tribune, Chicago Sun-Times, LA Daily News, The Denver Post, Milwaukee Sentinel, New York Times.

Chicago Reader was skeptical about the show's potential for success and wrote in 1992, "it's hard to imagine—a commercial network being built around [this] program." One reason given was the show's topics, such as an episode about marijuana and its legalization. The Chicago Sun-Times wrote that another episode stood out for its "obvious anti-war slant" and "disturbing... collage of comments and images" in addition to its Memorial Day airdate across 257 PBS stations.

Cancellation 
The show ended after 51 episodes, in 1992, when PBS chose not to renew funding. Tom Weinberg and Joel Cohen stated in an interview that the cancellation was likely caused by PBS being afraid of losing funding from CPB as a result of the show, as CPB was funded by Congress and had its Republican members targeted in the Convention episode.

Episodes 
The show's episodes were preserved by Media Burn Archive. The preservation and digitization of the collection was made possible from a $79,000 grant from the “Save America’s Treasures” program of the National Endowment for the Humanities in 2011. Despite that the original content has been created using consumer-grade camcorders that operated in interlaced video format, Media Burn Archive presents the videos in progressive scan form, mostly in 30p and occasionally in 24p.

Season 1 (1989)
The pilot of the show was aired in June and aired every Sunday. It was picked up by three stations, KDBI-TV in Colorado, WTTW in Illinois, and a West Virginian station. The MacArthur Foundation funded the first season's 13 episodes.

Season 2 (1990) 
Season 2 was on 90 stations and aired between 10 PM to 12 AM on Saturdays.

Season 3 (1991) 
Season 3 aired every Tuesday.

Season 4 (1991-92) 
Season 4 aired every Friday.

25th Anniversary Special 
In 2015, Media Burn Archive produced a series of videos to celebrate The 90's 25th anniversary, which were presented on Media Burn's website and YouTube channel. The categories were Global 90's, 90's Characters, 90's People, First Reality TV, Election Specials, and The Media.

See also 
 Image Union (1978-1991)
 Vanguard (2008-2013)
 Fault Lines (2009-2018)

References 

PBS original programming
1989 American television series debuts
1992 American television series endings
1992 United States presidential election